MFC 30: Up Close and Personal was a mixed martial arts event held by the Maximum Fighting Championship (MFC) on June 10, 2011 at the Mayfield Inn Trade and Conference Centre in Edmonton, Alberta. The event was broadcast live on HDNet.

Background
According to MFC Director of Media and Fighter Relations Scott Zerr, the promotion and Lightweight title holder Antonio McKee opted to "mutually vacate" the title.

Thomas Denny vs. Sheldon Westcott was a rematch from MFC 28 which ended in a split draw.

The judges' scores for the Demarce/Washington were initially read incorrectly with Washington announced as the winner.  This was later corrected during the broadcast by the announcers.

Results
Lightweight bout:  Drew Fickett vs.  Brian Cobb
Cobb defeated Fickett via TKO (punches) at 4:44 in round 1.
Welterweight bout:  Marcus Davis vs.  Pete Spratt
Davis defeated Spratt via unanimous decision (29–28, 30–27, 29–28).
Catchweight (165 lb.) bout:  Thomas Denny vs.  Sheldon Westcott
Westcott defeated Denny via unanimous decision (29–27, 29–27, 29–27).  Westcott was docked one point in the second round for repeated punches to the back of the head.
Welterweight bout:  Dhiego Lima vs.  Jamie Tone
Lima defeated Toney via KO (punches) at 3:47 of round 1.
Catchweight (159 lb.) bout:  Robert Washington vs.  Curtis Demarce
Demarce defeated Washington via split decision (30–27, 28–29, 29–28).
Middleweight bout:  Cody Krahn vs.  Andreas Spång
Spång defeated Krahn via submission (guillotine choke) at 1:18 of round 1.
Lightweight bout:  Scott Cleve vs.  Mukai Maromo
 Maromo defeated Cleve	via TKO (punches) at 0:36 of round 1.
Lightweight bout:  Garret Nybakken vs.  Jevon Marshall
Nybakken defeated Marshall via TKO (punches) at 0:16 of round 1.

References

30
2011 in mixed martial arts
Mixed martial arts in Canada
Sport in Edmonton
2011 in Canadian sports
June 2011 sports events in Canada